"Eloise" was an American television play broadcast on November 22, 1956, as part of the CBS television series, Playhouse 90. It was the eighth episode of the series.

Plot
Eloise is a lonesome six-year-old girl who lives with her nanny at the Plaza Hotel.

Cast
The cast included performances by:

 Evelyn Rudie as Eloise
 Ethel Barrymore as herself
 Louis Jourdan as himself
 Kay Thompson as herself
 Hans Conried as Rene the French Waiter
 Charlie Ruggles as Murphy
 Mildred Natwick as Nanny
 Jack Mullaney as Eloise's Tutor
 Conrad Hilton as himself
 Maxie Rosenbloom as himself
 Monty Woolley as himself
 William Roerick as Manager of the Plaza
 Inger Stevens as Joanna
 Bartlett Robinson as Eloise's Lawyer

Robert Preston hosted the broadcast.

Production
The play was based on Kay Thompson's children's book Eloise. The book was released in June 1955. Leonard Spigelgass wrote the teleplay based on Thompson's book. John Frankenheimer was the director and Martin Manulis the producer. The play was staged at CBS Television City in Los Angeles.

Reception
In The New York Times, Jack Gould panned the production "totally preposterous television", "sophomoric chaos", "a ludicrous hodgepodge", "agony", "childish" (as opposed to "childlike"), "idiotic and contrived, wholly farcical without being funny."

In the St. Louis Globe-Democrat, John Lester credited Rudie with a "technically remarkable" performance given her age, but opined that the selection of the material "indicates a weakness of basic judgment that could -- and probably will -- result in other offerings, equally superficial and nonsensical."

References

1956 American television episodes
Playhouse 90 (season 1) episodes
1956 television plays